Camargo Municipality may refer to
 Camargo Municipality, Chuquisaca, in Chuquisaca Department, Bolivia
 Camargo Municipality, Chihuahua, Mexico
 Camargo Municipality, Tamaulipas, Mexico

Municipality name disambiguation pages